The 1865 Melbourne Cup was a two-mile handicap horse race which took place on Thursday, 2 November 1865.

This year was the fifth running of the Melbourne Cup. The Victoria Racing Club awarded a trophy for the first time in the history of the race. The race was won by an 8 year old Gray named Toryboy becoming both the first gray and 8 year old to win the race. The runner up, Panic actually protested the race which was quickly dismissed.

This was the first year a trophy was awarded to the winning owner.  Toryboy’s owner B Marshall, reportedly sold the trophy, which he considered a monstrosity.

This is the list of placegetters for the 1865 Melbourne Cup.

See also

 Melbourne Cup
 List of Melbourne Cup winners
 Victoria Racing Club

References

External links
1865 Melbourne Cup footyjumpers.com

1865
Melbourne Cup
Melbourne Cup
19th century in Melbourne
1860s in Melbourne